Central Trust Company Buildings are two historic commercial buildings located at Altoona, Blair County, Pennsylvania.  They are two five-story buildings connected by a stair and elevator tower.  The buildings measure .  The Central Trust Company Building was built in 1905 and is a white glazed brick building with brownstone trim in the Beaux Arts style. The entry features two Ionic order engaged granite columns. The adjoining Brett Building was built between 1922 and 1924.

The buildings were added to the National Register of Historic Places in 1984 and are located in the Downtown Altoona Historic District.

References

External links

Commercial buildings on the National Register of Historic Places in Pennsylvania
Historic American Buildings Survey in Pennsylvania
Romanesque Revival architecture in Pennsylvania
Beaux-Arts architecture in Pennsylvania
Commercial buildings completed in 1905
Commercial buildings completed in 1924
Buildings and structures in Altoona, Pennsylvania
National Register of Historic Places in Blair County, Pennsylvania
Individually listed contributing properties to historic districts on the National Register in Pennsylvania
1905 establishments in Pennsylvania